XHRCH-FM is a radio station on 100.1 FM in Ojinaga, Chihuahua, Mexico. The station is owned by Grupo BM Radio.

History
XHRCH received its concession as XERCH-AM 1340 on December 13, 1973. It was owned by Jaime Hernández Pérez Rulfo.

It migrated to FM in 2011, by which time it was owned by Radio Grupo Chihuahua, a Radiorama subsidiary. In 2015, the station applied to reduce its power from 25 kW to 5.14 kW on a higher tower; it was also sold to its current owner.

References

Christian radio stations in Mexico
Radio stations in Chihuahua